Robert Francis Hennessey (born April 20, 1952) is an American prelate of the Roman Catholic Church. On October 12, 2006 he was appointed as an auxiliary bishop of the Archdiocese of Boston in Massachusetts.

Biography
Robert Hennessey was born in South Boston, Massachusetts, to John and Eileen (née Cahill) Hennessey. His father was a policeman with the Boston Police Department.  The second of five children, he has two brothers, John and Daniel, and two sisters, Deborah and Barbara. Hennessey attended St. Augustine Grammar School in South Boston, then was accepted for seventh grade at Boston Latin School. Hennessey then spent the next eight years at St. John's Seminary in Boston. He was ordained a deacon in 1977.

Priesthood 
Hennessey was ordained to the priesthood by Cardinal Humberto Medeiros on May 20, 1978 for the Archdiocese of Boston. After his ordination, he was assigned as parochial vicar at St. Joseph Parish in Hanson, Massachusetts. Hennessey's next assignment was as parochial vicar at St. Peter Parish in Plymouth, Massachusetts.  In 1983, he was assigned to St. Joseph Parish in Needham, Massachusetts, staying there for three years.  He then entered a graduate studies program at Moreau Seminary at the University of Notre Dame in Notre Dame, Indiana.

Hennessey spent the next six years serving in the Missionary Society of St. James the Apostle in Bolivia. Following his return to Boston in 1994, Hennessey became pastor of Most Holy Redeemer Paris in East Boston, Massachusetts, serving there for the next 12 years.  In 1995, he became the administrator of Our Lady of the Airways Chapel at Logan International Airport until 1998.

Auxiliary Bishop of Boston
On October 12, 2006, Hennessey was appointed as an auxiliary bishop of the Archdiocese of Boston and titular bishop of Tigias. He received his episcopal consecration on December 12, 2006, from Archbishop Seán O'Malley, with Bishops John Boles and Emilio Allué serving as co-consecrators His episcopal motto is "Magnificat Anima Mea Dominum" Luke 1:46-55, meaning, "My soul doth magnify the Lord".

Hennessey first held the post of episcopal vicar for the Central Pastoral Region of the archdiocese, but was transferred on January 23, 2014 to the Merrimack Region.

See also

 Catholic Church hierarchy
 Catholic Church in the United States
 Historical list of the Catholic bishops of the United States
 List of Catholic bishops of the United States
 Lists of patriarchs, archbishops, and bishops

References

1952 births
Living people
Clergy from Boston
21st-century American Roman Catholic titular bishops
Saint John's Seminary (Massachusetts) alumni
University of Notre Dame alumni
Roman Catholic Archdiocese of Boston